Vieux-Condé is a commune in the Nord department in northern France. The village stands on a canalised section of the river Scheldt, adjacent to the northwest of Condé-sur-l'Escaut. It is part of the agglomeration (unité urbaine) of Valenciennes.

Name
The name of the village was formerly simply 'Condé', which is a place-name widespread in France, deriving possibly from a Gaulish word for a confluence of rivers.

The name is found in the Anglo-Saxon Chronicle for the year 883, reporting that Vikings sailed up the Scheldt to occupy Cundoþ. It is found as Vetus Condatum in the 'cartulaire de Vicogne' of 1215 and as Vies Condet in a work by Jacques de Guise of the 14th century

As the Prince of Condé was a prominent royalist, at the French Revolution the village was renamed 'Vieux-Nord-Libre' until 1810.

Population

Heraldry

Twinning
Bleicherode in Germany since 1961; also Niederzier in Germany since 1988.

See also
Communes of the Nord department

References

Vieuxconde